Panagiotis Papadopoulos (born May 23, 1985, in Thessaloniki, Greece) is a Greek wrestler who specializes in Greco-Roman wrestling.
He was a competed at the 2008 Summer Olympics in the super-heavyweight division, losing in his opening bout to Liu Deli from China.

References

Olympic wrestlers of Greece
Wrestlers at the 2008 Summer Olympics
Living people
Greek male sport wrestlers
Mediterranean Games silver medalists for Greece
Competitors at the 2009 Mediterranean Games
Mediterranean Games medalists in wrestling
1985 births
Sportspeople from Thessaloniki
21st-century Greek people